Flagstaff is a town in the OR Tambo District Municipality of the Eastern Cape province of South Africa located some 80 km south-east of Kokstad and 45 km north of Lusikisiki. It is the seat of the Ingquza Hill Local Municipality.

History
The town developed from a trading station established in 1877 and derives its name from the practice by the owners of hoisting a white flag on Sundays to indicate that the store was closed. For many years it served as a post of the Cape Mounted Rifles.

Education
The Flagstaff Primary School at Dlibona village was completed at a cost of R39 million in 2019. It consists of seven classrooms, a nutrition centre, science laboratory, multimedia centre, multipurpose classroom, administration block v8 security room. Langa Secondary school located in Mashwabana settlement is one of the best science high schools in Flagstaff , well known for producing the best matric results as they are sitting on 89.9% pass rate. Langa S.S is a good school because it offers the following studies: science, computer, commerce and hospitality.

References

External links

Populated places in the Ngquza Hill Local Municipality